Montoro may refer to:

Places
Montoro, a Spanish municipality in the Province of Córdoba, Andalusia
Montoro, Campania, an Italian municipality in the Province of Avellino, Campania
Montoro Inferiore, a former Italian municipality in the Province of Avellino, Campania
Montoro Superiore, a former Italian municipality in the Province of Avellino, Campania
Montoro (Filottrano), an Italian civil parish of Filottrano (AN), Marche
Montoro (Narni), an Italian civil parish of Narni (TR), Umbria

People
André Franco Montoro (1916-1999), Brazilian politician
Cristóbal Montoro (1950-), Spanish politician
Ángel Montoro Sánchez (1988-), Spanish footballer
Ángel Montoro Cabello (1989-), Spanish handballer

See also
Montorio, disambiguation page